Montandon is a commune in the Doubs department in the Franche-Comté region in eastern France.

Montandon may also refer to:

Places
Montandon, Pennsylvania, a census-designated place in Northumberland County, Pennsylvania, United States

People
Arnold Montandon, a French entomologist
George Montandon, a Swiss French anthropologist
Gil Montandon, a Swiss ice hockey player
Mike Montandon, an American politician and former mayor of Las Vegas
Patricia Montandon, an American author
Philippe Montandon, a Swiss footballer

French-language surnames